Thomas Wotton may refer to:

 Thomas Wotton (surgeon) (1582–1669), with first colonists to Jamestown, Virginia
 Thomas Wotton (genealogist) (died 1766), compiler of The English Baronetage
 Thomas Wotton (sheriff) (1521–1587), sheriff of Kent
 Thomas Wotton, 2nd Baron Wotton (1587–1630), English peer